Italie 2 is the name of a large shopping centre in Paris' south east in the 13th arrondissement. It features a Printemps, fnac and over 130 stores, most of which are based overseas. The centre is situated over 3 levels with one level being subterranean (bas), one at ground level (rdc) and one above ground level (haut). The shopping centre is the largest within the perimeter of boulevard périphérique, Paris' ring road that typically confines Paris itself and is an unofficial boundary. This is mainly because the only other places with a department store in Paris are not situated within a shopping centre with the exception of Galeries Lafayette Montparnasse which is situated in a small shopping centre of about 10 stores at the base of Tour Montparnasse.

The centre is situated on Place d'Italie and is above Place d'Italie metro station.

External links
(French) Italie 2 homepage

Shops in Paris
13th arrondissement of Paris